The BC Lions are a professional Canadian football team based in Vancouver, British Columbia, and are members of the West Division in the Canadian Football League (CFL). The franchise was founded as an expansion team of the Western Interprovincial Football Union (WIFU) in 1954. In their 56-year history, the team has appeared in nine Grey Cup finals, and has won five championships. The Lions' current head coach is Rick Campbell and the current owner is David Braley.

The Lions' first head coach was Canadian Football Hall of Famer Annis Stukus, who coached the team for two WIFU seasons. The Annis Stukus Trophy—awarded annually to the CFL's best head coach—is named after Stukus. In 1958, the team joined the CFL as one of their charter members. Clem Crowe coached the Lions for its last two seasons in the WIFU and was their first head coach in the CFL. After coaching the first three games of the 1958 season, Crowe was replaced by a group of seven people who coached the Lions for the next two games. Dan Edwards was named head coach for the remaining 11 games. Dave Skrien was the first head coach to coach the Lions for more than three seasons. In his seven years coaching the team he led the Lions to two consecutive Grey Cup finals, including the team's first championship in 1964.

Vic Rapp coached the Lions from 1977 until the end of the 1982 season. He coached 96 regular season games with the Lions, which ranks second among Lions head coaches. Rapp won the Annis Stukus Trophy in the 1977 season, the only Lions head coach to do so without winning a Grey Cup championship. Hall of Famer Don Matthews took over the coaching position in the 1983 season and coached the Lions until midway through the 1987 season. He led the Lions to a Grey Cup championship and was named the Annis Stukus Trophy winner in the 1985 season. Matthews' .706 regular season winning percentage is the best among Lions head coaches.

From 1988 until 2002, no Lions head coach term lasted as long as four complete seasons. During this time, the Lions won the Grey Cup championship twice: under head coach Dave Ritchie in 1994  and under Steve Buratto in 2000. Adam Rita is the only head coach to have had multiple tenures with the Lions. As of the end of the 2011 season, Wally Buono is the franchise's all-time leader for the most regular-season games coached, regular-season games won, regular-season points, playoff games coached, and playoff games won. Buono coached the Lions to their fifth and sixth Grey Cup championships and was awarded the Annis Stukus Trophy in the 2006 and 2011 seasons. He is the only Lions head coach to have won more than one Grey Cup. Excluding the group of seven, and counting Rita once, there have been 26 head coaches for the Lions franchise.

Key

Head coaches

Note: Statistics are current through the end of the 2021 CFL season.

Notes
 A running total of the number of coaches of the Lions. Thus, any coach who has two or more separate terms as head coach is only counted once.
 Each year is linked to an article about that particular CFL season.
 The Lions were coached by a group of players led by Chuck Quilter,  Byron Bailey, and Paul Cameron, assistant coaches Vic Lindskog and Walt Schlinkman, training camp coach Fred Owens, and general manager Herb Capozzi during a two-game period in the 1958 CFL season.

References
General

Specific

Lists of Canadian Football League head coaches by team

Head Coaches